Kiviat may refer to:

People
Abel Kiviat, American middle-distance runner
Robert Kiviat, television writer and producer specializing in paranormal phenomenon

Other
 Kiviat diagram: a radar chart, graphical method of displaying multivariate data